Konstantin Kobovich Maradishvili (born 7 February 2000) is a Russian football player of Georgian descent who plays as defensive midfielder for FC Lokomotiv Moscow.

Club career
Born in Moscow to a Georgian father and a Russian mother.
Maradishvili made his debut in the Russian Premier League for PFC CSKA Moscow on 14 July 2019 in a game against PFC Krylia Sovetov Samara, as an 88th-minute substitute for Arnór Sigurðsson. On 23 June 2020, CSKA Moscow announced that Maradishvili had extended his contract with the club until the summer of 2025.

On 2 September 2021, he signed a five-year contract with FC Lokomotiv Moscow.

International career
He was called up to the Russia national football team for the first time in October 2021 for the World Cup qualifiers against Cyprus and Croatia. He was included in the extended 41-players list of candidates.

Career statistics

Club

References

External links
 
 

2000 births
Footballers from Moscow
Russian sportspeople of Georgian descent
Living people
Russian footballers
Russia youth international footballers
Russia under-21 international footballers
Association football midfielders
PFC CSKA Moscow players
FC Lokomotiv Moscow players
Russian Premier League players